Västerås SK is a Swedish sports club located in Västerås, with several sections:

 Västerås SK Bandy - men's bandy
 Västerås SK Bandy (women) - women's bandy
 Västerås SK Fotboll - football
 Västerås SK Hockey - ice hockey

Sport in Västerås